is a Japanese judoka. He won the gold medal in the openweight division at the 2010 World Judo Championships by defeating Teddy Riner of France by a flags decision. Kamikawa is known for being a very technical judoka for a heavy weight and uses techniques such as harai goshi and uchi mata with frequency.  He represented Japan at the 2012 Summer Olympics.

References

External links
 
 

1989 births
Living people
Japanese male judoka
Judoka at the 2010 Asian Games
Asian Games medalists in judo
World judo champions
Judoka at the 2012 Summer Olympics
Olympic judoka of Japan
Universiade medalists in judo
Medalists at the 2010 Asian Games
Asian Games bronze medalists for Japan
Universiade silver medalists for Japan
Universiade bronze medalists for Japan
Medalists at the 2009 Summer Universiade
20th-century Japanese people
21st-century Japanese people